The Fischer indole synthesis is a chemical reaction that produces the aromatic heterocycle indole from a (substituted) phenylhydrazine and an aldehyde or ketone under acidic conditions. The reaction was discovered in 1883 by Emil Fischer. Today antimigraine drugs of the triptan class are often synthesized by this method.

This reaction can be catalyzed by Brønsted acids such as HCl, H2SO4, polyphosphoric acid and p-toluenesulfonic acid or Lewis acids such as boron trifluoride, zinc chloride, iron chloride, and aluminium chloride.

Several reviews have been published.

Reaction mechanism
The reaction of a (substituted) phenylhydrazine with a carbonyl (aldehyde or ketone) initially forms a phenylhydrazone which isomerizes to the respective enamine (or 'ene-hydrazine'). After protonation, a cyclic [3,3]-sigmatropic rearrangement occurs producing an imine. The resulting imine forms a cyclic aminoacetal (or aminal), which under acid catalysis eliminates NH3, resulting in the energetically favorable aromatic indole.

Isotopic labelling studies show that the aryl nitrogen (N1) of the starting phenylhydrazine is incorporated into the resulting indole.

Buchwald modification
Via a palladium-catalyzed reaction, the Fischer indole synthesis can be effected by cross-coupling aryl bromides and hydrazones. This result supports the previously proposed intermediacy as hydrazone intermediates in the classical Fischer indole synthesis. These N-arylhydrazones undergo exchange with other ketones, expanding the scope of this method.

Application
Indometacin preparation.
Triptan synthesis
Iprindole synthesis (phenylhydrazine + suberone → 2,3-Cycloheptenoindole).

See also
Bartoli indole synthesis
Japp–Klingemann indole synthesis
Leimgruber–Batcho indole synthesis
Larock indole synthesis

Related reactions
Madelung synthesis
Reissert synthesis
Gassman synthesis
Nenitzescu synthesis

References

Indole forming reactions
Name reactions
Emil Fischer